Adrián Cruz Juncal (born 18 July 1987) is a Spanish professional footballer who plays for Pontevedra CF as a midfielder.

Football career
Born in Moaña, Pontevedra, Galicia, Cruz finished his formation with Alondras CF, making his senior debuts in 2006, in Tercera División. In the 2007 summer he moved to Pontevedra CF, being assigned to the reserves also in the fourth level.

Cruz was promoted to the latter's main squad in Segunda División B in 2009, but on 2 February 2010 was loaned to fellow league team Polideportivo Ejido, until June. After one season as a starter (which ended in relegation), he moved to Montañeros CF also in the third division.

On 28 July 2012 Cruz signed for CD Guijuelo, but on 25 August moved to Club Marino de Luanco, due to the former's poor financial situation. On 20 June of the following year he joined CD Ourense, after scoring six goals for Marino.

On 3 July 2014 Cruz moved to Racing de Ferrol, still in the third tier. On 26 June of the following year, after appearing regularly with the Diaños Verdes, he signed a one-year deal with CA Osasuna in Segunda División.

Cruz made his professional debut on 22 August 2015, coming on as a second-half substitute for Oier Sanjurjo in a 2–0 away win against UE Llagostera. On 1 February of the following year, he was loaned to UD Logroñés until June.

On 1 July 2016 Cruz signed a one-year contract with Real Murcia in the third level, after rescinding with the Navarrese outfit.

Personal life
In December 2012 Cruz was arrested after assaulting a police officer, but was released a day later.

References

External links

1987 births
Living people
Spanish footballers
Footballers from Moaña
Association football midfielders
Segunda División players
Segunda División B players
Tercera División players
Pontevedra CF footballers
Polideportivo Ejido footballers
Marino de Luanco footballers
CD Ourense footballers
Racing de Ferrol footballers
CA Osasuna players
UD Logroñés players
Real Murcia players
Burgos CF footballers
CD Guijuelo footballers
CD Arenteiro players